Eddy Bensoussan (born 1938 in Rio de Janeiro) is a Brazilian physician.

Bensoussan graduated in 1962 with a specialty in occupational diseases, internal medicine and clinical physiopathology. He served as director of the Occupational Health Division of the Rio de Janeiro State University Hospital, and as director-general of the School of Medicine of the Rio de Janeiro State University.

He has co-authored many books and papers on medical education and hospital management. His Clinic Examination Manual (Ed.Cultura Medica, Rio de Janeiro) was a standard textbook for medical students for 20 years.

Works
 Manual do Exame Clínico (co-author Fernando Bevilacqua) 
 Fisiopatologia Clínica (co-author Fernando Bevilacqua)
 Saúde ocupacional
 Medicina e meio-ambiente
 Manual de Higiene, Segurança e Medicina do Trabalho" (Ed. Atheneu, 1997 ) 
 FISIOPATOLOGIA CLÍNICA PATHOPHYSIOLOGY CLINICAL, FERNANDO BEVILACQUA & EDDY BENSOUSSAN & JOSÉ MANOEL JANSEN & FERNANDO SPÍNOLA E CASTRO FERNANDO BEVILACQUA, 
 MANUAL DE HIGIENE, SEGURANÇA E MEDICINA DO TRABALHO, EDDY BENSOUSSAN & SÉRGIO ALBIERI, DADOS DA EDIÇÂO,

References

1938 births
People from Rio de Janeiro (city)
Brazilian Jews
Brazilian pathologists
Jewish physicians
Living people
Academic staff of the Rio de Janeiro State University
Occupational health practitioners